This is a list of historians who worked in Belgium and its predecessor states and made contributions to the history of Belgium.

Medieval Belgium
 Heriger of Lobbes (c.925–1007), compiler of the Gesta Episcoporum Leodiensium to 667
 Anselm of Liège (1008–c.1056), continuator of the Gesta Episcoporum Leodiensium from 667 to 1048
 Sigebert of Gembloux (c.1030–1112), author of Chronicon sive Chronographia and Gesta abbatum Gemblacensium
 Anselm of Gembloux (died 1136), continuator of Sigebert of Gembloux's Chronicon
 Renier of St Laurent (died 1188), author of Triumphale Bulonicum on the siege of Bouillon Castle, 1141
 Lambert of Ardres (fl. 1194–1203), author of Historia comitum Ghisnensium
 Giles of Orval, continuator of the Gesta episcoporum Leodiensium from 1048 to 1247
 Jacob van Maerlant (1230/40–1288/99), author of a world chronicle, the Spiegel Historiael
 Jan van Heelu (13th century), author of a Rymkronyk of the 1288 Battle of Worringen
 Jean de Hocsem (1278–1348), continuator of the Gesta episcoporum Leodiensium from 1247 to 1347
 Jan van Boendale (c.1280–c.1351), author of Brabantsche yeesten and Van den derden Eduwaert (an account of the 1340 Siege of Tournai)
 Jacques de Guyse (1334−1399), author of Annales Historiae Illustrium Principum Hannoniae (Annals of Hainaut)
 Jean d'Outremeuse (1338–1400), author of La Geste de Liége and Ly Myreur des Histors
 Jean de Stavelot
 Gilles li Muisis
 Edmond de Dynter, author of Chronica ducum Lotharingiae et Brabantiae
 Jean Mansel
 Jean d'Enghien
 Jean de Haynin
 Jacques de Hemricourt (1333–1403), author of the Miroir des nobles de Hesbaye
 Guillaume de Vottem (died 1403), author of a chronicle of Liège
 Jean Froissart (c.1337–c.1405), author of a chronicle of the opening decades of the Hundred Years' War
 Wein van Cotthem (c.1390–1457), author of two books of the Brabantsche yeesten
 Petrus de Thimo (1393–1474), author of Brabantiae historia diplomatica
 Enguerrand de Monstrelet (c.1400–1453), author of a chronicle of the later decades of the Hundred Years' War
 Georges Chastellain (died 1475), author of a chronicle of the period 1417–1474
 Olivier de la Marche (1425–1502), memoirist and chronicler of the Burgundian Netherlands
 Jean Molinet (1435–1507), author of La complainte de Grece
 Costen van Halmale (1432/37–1508), initial compiler of the Annales Antwerpienses

Early-modern Belgium
 Filips Wielant (1440/1–1520), author of Recueil des Antiquités de Flandre
 Remi du Puys (active 1511–1515)
 Cornelius Grapheus (1482–1558)
 Adrianus Barlandus (1486–1538)
 Melchior Barlaeus (died 1540)
 Jacobus Lessabaeus (died 1557)
 Jacobus Meyerus (1491–1552)
 Hubertus Thomas (c.1495–1555)
 Joos de Damhouder (1507–1581)
 Marcus van Vaernewyck (1518–1569), author of Van die beroerlicke tijden in die Nederlanden en voornamelick in Ghendt 1566-1568 and De historie van Belgis
 Johannes Goropius Becanus (1519–1572)
 Lodovico Guicciardini (1521–1589)
 Joannes Molanus (1533–1585)
 Petrus Divaeus (1535–1581)
 Jacobus Marchantius (1537–1609), author of De rebus gestis à Flandriae comitibus (1557) and Flandria commentariorum (1596)
 Justus Lipsius (1547–1606)
 Floris Van der Haer (1547–1634)
 Guillaume Gazet (1554–1612)
 Franciscus Haraeus (1555?–1631)
 Adriaan van Meerbeeck (1563–1627)
 Ferry de Locre (1571–1614)
 Aubertus Miraeus (1573–1640)
 Erycius Puteanus (1574–1646)
 Jean-Baptiste Gramaye (1579–1635)
 Nicolaus Vernulaeus (1583–1649) 
 Antonius Sanderus (1586–1664), author of Flandria Illustrata (1641)
 Valerius Andreas (1588–1655), author of Bibliotheca Belgica (1623) and Fasti academici (1635)
 Gaspar Gevartius (1593–1666)
 Olivier de Wree (1596–1652), author of Sigilla comitum Flandriae (1639) and Genealogia Comitum Flandriae (1642–1643)
 Charles de Visch (1596–1666)
 Martin Valvekens (1604–1682)

Kingdom of Belgium

19th century
 Sylvain Balau
 Stanislas Bormans
 Victor Coremans
 Louis Prosper Gachard
 Arthur Gaillard
 Victor Gaillard
 Théodore Juste
 Godefroid Kurth
 Joseph Kervyn de Lettenhove
 Philippe Kervyn de Volkaersbeke
 Henri Lonchay
 François Joseph Ferdinand Marchal, author of  Histoire des Pays-Bas autrichiens (1841) and Histoire politique du règne de l'empereur Charles-Quint (1856)
 Charles Moeller
 Jean Moeller
 P. F. X. de Ram
 Frédéric Auguste Ferdinand Thomas de Reiffenberg
 Edouard Van Even
 Alphonse Wauters
 G. Henry Wouters, author of Historiae ecclesiasticae compendium (3 vols., 1842–1843); Dissertationes in selecta historiae ecclesiasticae capita (4 vols., 1868–1872)

20th century
 Stephanus Axters (Church history)
 Ursmer Berlière (Church history)
 Wim Blockmans (medievalist)
 Wilfrid Brulez (economic history)
 Patricia Carson (medievalist)
 Alfred Cauchie (Church history)
 Lucien Ceyssens (Church history)
 Hilde De Ridder-Symoens (university history)
 Arthur De Schrevel (Church history)
 Marie de Villermont (women's history)
 François-Louis Ganshof (medievalist)
 Léopold Genicot (medievalist)
 Léon-Ernest Halkin (Church history)
 Karl Hanquet (medievalist)
 Paul Harsin (early modernist)
 Félix Magnette (18th and 19th centuries)
 Jules Mees (historical geography)
 Jos Monballyu
 Édouard de Moreau (Church history) 
 Anne Morelli (history of migration)
 Henri Pirenne (medievalist)
 Walter Prevenier
 Jan Roegiers (intellectual historian)
 Félix Rousseau (medievalist)
 Aloïs Simon (Church history)
 Jean Stengers (colonial history)
 Jacques Stiennon (medievalist)
 Egied-Idesbald Strubbe
 Charles Terlinden 
 Raoul Van Caenegem (medievalist)
 Leon van der Essen
 Herman Van der Wee (economic historian)
 Raymond van Uytven (medievalist)
 Charles Verlinden (medievalist)
 Lode Wils

21st century
 Hans Cools (early-modern history)
 Sophie De Schaepdrijver (20th-century history)
 Dirk Imhof (book history)
 Randall Lesaffer (legal history)
 Brigitte Meijns (medievalist)

Art historians
 Barbara Baert
 Marthe Crick-Kuntziger
 Dirk De Vos
 Elisabeth Dhanens
 Isabelle Errera
 Hippolyte Fierens-Gevaert
 Philippe Roberts-Jones
 Adelbert Van de Walle
 Katlijne Van der Stighelen
 Jan Van der Stock
 Alphonse-Jules Wauters

Literary historians
 Rita Lejeune

Historians of philosophy
 Maurice De Wulf
 Adriaan Pattin
 Isabelle Stengers

References

 
Historians
Belgian